The SEAT Córdoba is the saloon, estate and coupé version of the SEAT Ibiza supermini car, built by the Spanish automaker SEAT. It was manufactured between 1993 and 2010, and was related to the second and third generations of the Ibiza.

First generation (Typ 6K; 1993) 

The first-generation Córdoba was presented at the 1993 Frankfurt Motor Show and launched that summer. Designed by Italian Giorgetto Giugiaro, it was based on the chassis of the SEAT Ibiza Mk2. Its 1.4, 1.6, 1.8 and 2.0-litre petrol engines were also found in the Volkswagen Polo and Ibiza, as was the 1.9 TDI.

Variants
In 1996, the Córdoba range was extended with a coupé (Córdoba SX) and an estate (Córdoba Vario).

SX
The Córdoba SX was a two-door coupé version of the Córdoba. It came with five engine variants: 1.6 litre ; 1.9 litre turbodiesel; 1.8 litre, 16 valve; 2.0 litre, 8 valve (which was also used in the Córdoba GTi); and a 2.0 litre, 16 valve. The top of the range engine delivers 150 horsepower. The 2.0 litre ABF engine in this model was also used in the third-generation Golf GTi and the first Ibiza Cupra.

Facelift

The Córdoba was facelifted in 1999, with changes focusing on the bumpers, headlights, taillights and front grille, as well as in the interior, with new materials and upholstery. In the engine range, the 16-valve ABF engine was replaced with a 1.8-litre  turbo engine and joined the Cupra range.

The SX was no longer available in the United Kingdom, and limited numbers are known to exist in the Republic of Ireland in RHD format. The "Córdoba Vario" estate variant dropped the "Cordóba" and became simply the "Vario".

Motorsport

Rally
It featured a 2.0-litre turbocharged engine and achieved a total of three podium finishes.

Rallycross
A Córdoba has also been used in the FIA World Rallycross Championship. Danish driver Dennis Rømer contested the 2014 World RX of Germany, finishing 40th out of 41 entrants in the heat stage. To date this is, and most likely will remain, the only time a Córdoba has been used in World Championship rallycross. However, the SEAT Ibiza has been used as a manufacturer entry.

Rebadged versions

The contemporary Volkswagen Polo Classic (saloon) and estate variant were rebadged versions of the SEAT Córdoba Mk1 and Córdoba Vario respectively, and were not based on the Volkswagen Polo hatchback.

FAW-Volkswagen, Volkswagen's partner in China, manufactured the Córdoba Mk1 under the Volkswagen Citi Golf name between 1994 and 2001. The Citi Golf had the same exterior as the pre-facelift Córdoba and the 1.4-litre ABD engine was standard paired with a five-speed manual gearbox. When it was new in 1995, pricing was 240,000 yuan (35,640 USD - October 2020 exchange rate).

In Mexico it was rebadged as the Volkswagen Derby. In 1995, it was imported from Spain, but the 1996 model was assembled in the Volkswagen de México assembly plant in Puebla, Mexico. In 1998, the Spanish-made Polo Classic was introduced in Mexico as the new Volkswagen Derby.

The Volkswagen Polo Classic was also sold in the Philippines from 1996 to 1999, and in South Africa from 1996 to 2002.

Engines

Second generation (Typ 6L; 2002) 

The second-generation Córdoba was presented at the 2002 Paris Motor Show as the four-door saloon version of the SEAT Ibiza Mk3 hatchback. No estate or coupé versions of the second generation were developed.

The Córdoba Mark II shares its chassis and engines with the Volkswagen Polo Mk4 and Škoda Fabia Mk1 and Mk2.

In Mexico, Córdoba production continues at the Volkswagen de México Puebla assembly plant. It has the four cylinder 2.0 litre  engine combined with a five-speed manual or an optional six-speed Tiptronic transmission.
 
The Córdoba was withdrawn from sale in the UK in 2006 and shortly afterwards was removed from SEAT UK's website. In other other European countries, sales ended in 2009, the year after production ceased.

Engines

Sales and production figures
The total production per year of SEAT Córdoba cars, manufactured in SEAT and other Volkswagen group's plants, is shown below:

A total of 1,034,465 Córdobas have been produced.

References

External links

Córdoba
Subcompact cars
Sedans
Touring cars
Front-wheel-drive vehicles
2000s cars
Cars introduced in 1993
Cars of Spain
Station wagons